The Ontario Rugby Union (ORU) also known as Rugby Ontario is the provincial governing body for the sport of rugby union in the Canadian province of Ontario and a Provincial Union of Rugby Canada. Rugby Ontario governs various levels of rugby (Under-7, Under-9, Under-11, Under-13, Under-15, Under-17, Under-19, Senior, Masters, Non-contact).

You can find a list of clubs in Ontario here.

High Performance Program 
Rugby Ontario is represented on the National stage by the Ontario Blues. This program includes 15's teams at the following ages: U15, U16, U17, U18, U19, U20 and Senior; which compete at the Canadian Rugby Championship in championship and festival divisions. The Senior Men's side competes for the MacTier Cup. Also included in Rugby Ontario's provincial program are 7s teams at the U18 level, who compete for the Canadian Rugby U18 7s National Championships.

Representation at the national level 
The Rugby Ontario program and its clubs have produced ten High Performance players currently on the Rugby Canada National Men's Team (XVs); 12 High Performance players currently on the Rugby Canada National Women's Team (XVs); five High Performance players currently on the Rugby Canada National Men's Sevens Team; and eight High Performance players currently on the Rugby Canada National Women's Sevens Team.

Senior Men's and Women's Competition 
There are ten men's competitions which are sanctioned by the ORU. The Marshall Premiership and Championship are contested by the best teams from the Toronto Rugby Union and the Niagara Rugby Union, and feature promotion and relegation. The lower leagues are run by the branch unions. The winners of the TRU and NRU compete in the Intermediate Cup against the lowest placed team in the Marshall Championship to determine who will play in the Championship the following year.

In addition to the men's competitions, there are 6 women's competitions.

References

External links
 Ontario Rugby Union Website

Rugby union governing bodies in Canada
Rugby union in Ontario
Rugby